Runza Restaurant (formerly called Runza Drive-Inn and Runza Hut) is an American fast food restaurant whose flagship menu item is the runza sandwich.

History 
Founded in 1949 by Sally Everett, the chain began its expansion under Sally's son Donald Everett Sr. in 1966, and started franchising restaurants in 1979. As of November 2020, there are eighty-six Runza restaurants operating: eighty in Nebraska, two in Iowa, two in Kansas, and two in Colorado. The restaurant chain is still owned by the Everett family, and Sally's grandson Donald Everett Jr. serves as President. In addition to the namesake sandwich, the chain serves chili and cinnamon rolls (another Midwest dish), as well as other fast food staples like hamburgers, french fries and onion rings.

The chain attempted to expand outside of Nebraska in 1989. Executives tried to open a restaurant in the Latvian republic of the Soviet Union, going as far as shipping two hundred frozen Runza sandwiches to the Soviet Ministry of Agriculture as a part of its negotiations. The deal fell apart after Latvia was invaded by the Soviet government in an attempt to keep it in the Union. Stores did open in the Las Vegas Strip at the Fashion Show Mall's food court and a mall food court in Moline, Illinois but both failed to gain traction and closed within a few years.

Promotions 
Runza is a vendor in Memorial Stadium, home of the Nebraska Cornhuskers football team,  In 2017, the Omaha Storm Chasers, Omaha's Triple-A affiliate of the Kansas City Royals Major League Baseball team, rebranded themselves as the "Omaha Runzas" in a cross-promotional event. The team's rebranded uniforms featured a cartoon runza sandwich and shared the green and yellow livery of the Runza restaurant chain. Runza operated a 50s themed Rock n' Roll Runza featuring memorabilia, vintage automobiles and roller skating carhops out of downtown Lincoln from 1991 to 2004.

Nebraska Union controversy 

The Runza restaurant operating out of the Nebraska Union, the student union at the University of Nebraska-Lincoln, closed in 2018 after a decade of operating in the location. The Runza was outbid by a combination of two vendors (Steak 'n Shake and Chick-fil-A franchisees) bidding together. There was public outcry from the student body, as the runza is strongly identified as a Nebraskan dish, and students felt that it should be sold at Nebraska's flagship university.

References

Fast-food restaurants
Restaurant chains in the United States